Nils Ljunglöf (5 January 1896 – 18 August 1976) was a Swedish rower. He competed in the men's single sculls event at the 1920 Summer Olympics.

References

External links
 

1896 births
1976 deaths
Swedish male rowers
Olympic rowers of Sweden
Rowers at the 1920 Summer Olympics
Sportspeople from Stockholm